Illewong was a mining village, now a ghost town, in the Orana region of New South Wales, Australia. Prior to 1906, it was known as Bee Mountain.

Location 
The village was around 17.5 kilometres (the road distance was described as '12 miles' or 19 kilometres) south east of Cobar, in the County of Robinson, Parish of Narri. It should not be confused with the Parish of Illewong, in the adjoining County of Blaxland.

History

Aboriginal occupation 
The area that later became Illewong lies within the traditional lands of the Wangaaypuwan dialect speakers (also known as Wangaibon) of the Ngiyampaa people, referred to in their own language as  Ngiyampaa Wangaaypuwan.

Mining village and Queen Bee Copper Mine 
Before Illewong, the area was known as Bee Mountain. Gold was discovered there in June 1889 and, by August 1889, there had been a minor gold rush. Although some prospecting continued into the early 1890s, the field did not have a large and rich gold deposit, unlike the recently-established gold mines around Wrightville. In June 1902, a rich deposit of copper ore was discovered, and leases were taken out over 80 acres of land. The Queen Bee Copper Mining Company was established on 26 November 1903; its directors were local men from Cobar and Wrightville. The development of the Queen Bee mine and erection of its smelters were underway by mid 1904. By August 1905, the mine and smelters were well in production.

A settlement, including a store, had developed at Bee Mountain, by the end of 1904, and a post office opened there in 1905. The village named Illewong was proclaimed on 18 April 1906. In September 1906, the existing post office, named 'Bee Mountain, was renamed Illewong. The village was associated with the Queen Bee Copper Mine, and to its south the Queen Bee South, amongst others in the surrounding area. Always a small village, Illewong could nonetheless support sporting teams, even a rifle club. The village had a school from April 1905 to May 1916. 

By 1907, the Queen Bee mine had "a winding engine, a vertical engine for driving rock breakers,air blowers, saw benches, etc., a 9-h.p. rock drill air-compressing plant, fitting shop, a No.5 Krupp ball mill for crushing quartz, for fettling the smelting and roasting furnaces, three reverberatory smelting furnaces, one refining furnace, brick-making plant, and a 36in. water-jacket cupola furnace, with which experiments are being made for the purpose of securing data as to the best means of dealing with the low-grade ores."By 1907, the copper price was booming, The mine in those early years was profitable, and paid dividends in 1907. Nonetheless, the well-equipped but remote mine had its challenges. It was some distance from the nearest railway at Wrightville, Its copper ore grades had fallen over time, and were now mainly low-grade. The reverberatory furnaces used large amounts of wood as fuel. The slag from its reverberatory furnace contained around 1.5% copper, and it used the cupola furnace in experimental smelting that resulted in 0.3% copper in the slag. On the basis of the experiments, it had ordered a water jacket furnace, but it would need to bring coke from Wollongong, a costly proposition. The water jacket furnace was a success and its production rate was nearly equivalent to that of three reveberatory furnaces.

The heyday of the village lasted until 1909. The copper price fell in that year. An early sign of decline was that the company stopped using the reverberatory furnaces to smelt ore, in early April 1909; these had become too expensive to operate. One reverberatory furnace was used for roasting suilphide ores, but subsequently all smelting was done by the one water-jacket furnace. As well as reducing the total production rate of the smelters, to around half, this change almost certainly caused some employees to lose their jobs, putting downward pressure on the village's population.

In December 1909, the Queen Bee mine shutdown for a time, intending to raise more capital. Development work in the mine did not recommence until September 1910. Rising copper prices led to the Queen Bee mine resuming production by April 1912. 

The price of copper fell at the beginning of 1913. Despite optimistic reports, the mine needed urgent prospecting and development to uncover new ore. After just less than a year of full operation, in March 1913, the mine was once again shutdown.  Dalgety & Company made a petition to wind up the company, for unpaid debts, in December 1913, and an order to wind up the company was made in February 1914.

Decline 
The mining leases had been forfeited for non-payment of rent, in June 1913. The old company objected unsuccessfully when a local man, Robert Ellis, took out fresh leases and took possession of the mine site. When he claimed ownership of the all items on the leases, including any copper, the stockpiled ore, and the equipment of the Queen Bee mine, a protracted dispute began. Ellis did no mining but recovered copper and copper ore from the site, which he shipped to Port Kembla. He damaged the smelting furnaces, in order to obtain 50 tons of copper that was still in the furnace bottoms. The dispute ended, in July 1914, when the parties reached a settlement, ending legal action.

The village once had two hotels. One hotel, the Royal Hotel, also known as 'Daley's Hotel'. was totally destroyed, in a fire, at the end of March 1910. The building was owned by a reformed bushranger, Patrick Daley, and it was fully-insured. The village's remaining hotel, the Bee Mountain Hotel, also known as 'Martin's Hotel', also burned down, in November 1914; it was also  insured. The causes of both fires were unknown, but the timing of each fire corresponded to a protracted interruption of mining activity, and neither hotel was ever rebuilt.  

The village had a policeman, Constable Malony, who had been stationed there for seven years, when he was found dead with an apparently self-inflicted gunshot wound to the head, in October 1912. He was about to be transferred to Parkes, and his body was found when his replacement arrived. He was buried in the village's cemetery. The police station closed around December 1913.

By May 1915, the price of copper had risen, probably due to wartime demand, and there was the prospect of the mine reopening. In 1916, the old Queen Bee Copper Mine was reborn as the Mount Illewong Mine. The mine was dewatered, after around four years of inactivity. A new concentrator plant replaced the on-site smelting of the previous operations; the copper concentrate was shipped to a copper smelter and refinery at Port Kembla. This revival of the mine—it employed only around twenty men in February 1917—failed to last. Operations were "temporarily curtailed", in October 1917, with the reason being that Port Kembla already had too much ore. Six men later worked the mine as tributers, supplying the CSA  smelter near Cobar, but large scale mining there was over. Around March 1919, the equipment was stripped from the old Queen Bee Mine. 

In late 1922, the village was described as "deserted", and the school building was demolished and taken to Dubbo. In 1923, it was reported that only one family was dwelling there, and that a house or shop, in the deserted village, could be bought for just the value of the transfer fee. Only five votes had been recorded there in the 1920 election and, by 1926, Illewong was no longer significant enough to be a polling place. Money order and savings bank facilities were withdrawn from the post office, at the beginning of 1920, and the post office closed in 1927.   Without mining, the remote village had rapidly faded away. What seem to be the last official mentions of the place occurred during 1941, when the village's plan was altered, effectively reducing its area and the dedication of the land for its school was revoked.

Remnants 
Although its building allotments and street plan still exist, what was once the village of Illewong has now disappeared, except for some remains of the old mine workings and the village's cemetery. The old village site and mine ruins are not accessible to the public, because the access road is on private land.

See also 

 Elouera
 Wrightville

References 

Cobar
Mining towns in New South Wales
Ghost towns in New South Wales